Parliamentary elections were held in Hungary on 10 May 1998, with a second round of voting in 175 of the 176 single member constituencies on 24 May.

Although the Hungarian Socialist Party received the most votes, the then-liberal conservative Fidesz won the most seats. The successful breakthrough into parliament by the extreme right-wing Hungarian Justice and Life Party was also a major shock. After the election, Fidesz formed a centre-right coalition government with the Independent Smallholders Party and Hungarian Democratic Forum.

Results

Notes

References

External links
National Electoral Office

Hungary
Elections in Hungary
Parliament